Hacha Grande is a mountain on the Canary Island of Lanzarote, with an elevation of 562 m (1844 ft) above sea level. Its name is Spanish meaning Large Axe.

It is located in the municipality of Yaiza in the south-west of the island, near the resort of Playa Blanca and the Punta de Papagayo. The mountain makes up part of the highest mountain range on the island, Los Ajaches, which is designated a Special Protection Area (SPA) under the European Union's Birds Directive.

Lanzarote
Mountains of the Canary Islands